Tirpitz may refer to:

 Alfred von Tirpitz (1849–1930), German admiral
 German battleship Tirpitz, a World War II-era Bismarck-class battleship named after the admiral
 Tirpitz (pig), a pig rescued from the sinking of SMS Dresden and named after the admiral
Museums
 Tirpitz Museum (Denmark), focused on the Atlantic Wall in Denmark.
 Tirpitz Museum (Norway), focused on the battleship of same name.